Pierre Bardy (born 27 August 1992) is a French professional footballer who plays as defender for Cypriot club Olympiakos Nicosia.

Career
Bardy joined the youth academy of Rodez AF at the age of 16, and spent over a decade at the club before helping them get promoted to the French Ligue 2. He made his professional debut with Rodez in a 2–0 Ligue 2 win over AJ Auxerre on 26 July 2019.

On 24 August 2022, Bardy signed a contract with Olympiakos Nicosia in Cyprus for one season, with an option to extend for another year.

References

External links
 
 
 Rodez AF Profile

1992 births
People from Rodez
Sportspeople from Aveyron
Footballers from Occitania (administrative region)
Living people
Association football defenders
French footballers
Rodez AF players
Olympiakos Nicosia players
Ligue 2 players
Championnat National players
Championnat National 2 players
Championnat National 3 players
French expatriate footballers
Expatriate footballers in Cyprus
French expatriate sportspeople in Cyprus